Kalofer Hristozov (born 19 March 1969) is a Bulgarian gymnast. He competed at the 1988 Summer Olympics, the 1992 Summer Olympics and the 1996 Summer Olympics.

References

External links
 

1969 births
Living people
Bulgarian male artistic gymnasts
Olympic gymnasts of Bulgaria
Gymnasts at the 1988 Summer Olympics
Gymnasts at the 1992 Summer Olympics
Gymnasts at the 1996 Summer Olympics
Sportspeople from Plovdiv
European champions in gymnastics